Eulimellini is a tribe of minute sea snails, marine gastropod molluscs in the family Pyramidellidae, the pyrams and their allies.

Taxonomy 
According to Schander, Van Aartsen & Corgan (1999) there are 17 genera in the Eulimellinae.

As "Eulimellinae", this taxon was previously one of eleven recognised subfamilies of the Pyramidellidae (according to the taxonomy of Ponder & Lindberg, 1997).

In the taxonomy of Bouchet & Rocroi (2005), this subfamily Cingulininae was downgraded to the rank of tribe, as Eulimellini, belonging to the subfamily Turbonillinae.

Genera
Genera within the tribe Eulimellini include:

 Bacteridella Saurin, 1959
 Bacteridium Thiele, 1929
 Belonidium Cossmann, 1893
 Careliopsis Mörch, 1875
 Discobasis Cossmann, 1888
 Eulimella Forbes & MacAndrew, 1846 - type genus of the tribe Eulimellini
 Instarella Laseron, 1959
 Kejdonia Mifsud, 1999
 Koloonella Laseron, 1959
 Latavia Laseron, 1951
 Loxoptyxis Cossmann, 1888
 Paradoxella Laseron, 1951
 Raulostraca Oliver, 1915
 Saccoina Dall & Bartsch, 1904
 Tathrella Laseron, 1959
 Terelimella Laws, 1938
 Visma Dall & Bartsch, 1904

See also 
 Turbonillinae#Problematic genera within the family Turbonillinae

References

Pyramidellidae